Field Névé is a large névé between the Homerun Range and the Findlay Range in the Admiralty Mountains of Victoria Land, Antarctica. The feature lies between the upper reaches of Ebbe Glacier, which flows northwest, and Tucker Glacier, which flows southeast. It was named by the New Zealand Antarctic Place-Names Committee after Bradley Field, a geologist with the New Zealand Geological Survey, and a member of a New Zealand Antarctic Research Program geological party to northern Victoria Land, 1981–82. This glaciological feature lies situated on the Pennell Coast, a portion of Antarctica lying between Cape Williams and Cape Adare.

References 

Snow fields of Victoria Land
Pennell Coast
Névés of Antarctica